Hehoa is a genus of harvestmen in the family Sclerosomatidae. The genus contains the single species Hehoa bunigera.

References

Harvestmen
Monotypic arachnid genera